Redruth RFC (established 1875) is a rugby union club from the town of Redruth, Cornwall, currently playing in the fourth tier of the English league system, National League 2 West. The club runs a number of men's teams including 1st XV (National League 2 West), 2nd XV (Duchy League), Colts and a Select XV as well as a number of junior teams from age 7 through to 16.  They are one of the most successful club sides in Cornwall, having won the Cornwall Cup 10 times and the Cornwall Super Cup 3 times, and are currently the second highest ranked club side behind the Cornish Pirates. Redruth enjoys a strong rivalry with neighbours Camborne, with the two clubs meeting annually, in what is the world’s longest enduring rugby fixture.

History

Redruth RFC was founded in 1875 by Henry Grylls and W H Willimot. By the 1900s, the club was the most successful in Cornwall, a position they were to hold for much of the 20th century. In the 1930s, the team moved to the Recreation Ground near Plain an Gwary. At the time, the Recreation Ground was the third largest rugby ground in England.  When the leagues started in 1987, Redruth was in the provincial league of South-West 1, which they won. The team then won the old League Four South in 1991 and gained promotion. In 2005, the club reached its highest-ever ranking by winning promotion into National Division One. The team finished in 4th position in the 2006–07 season.

Ground
The Recreation Ground is situated on Cardrew Lane in Redruth, around five minutes walk from the town centre and Redruth railway station. The ground consists of a main pitch with a wooden grandstand alongside the clubhouse on the west side, and terraced grass banking on the other three sides. The ground also has several bars adjoining the grandstand, and there is also a secondary pitch for 2nd XV and junior fixtures. There is parking for around 100 cars but this is often limited on match-days and it is recommended that supporters park nearby in town.  

The capacity of the Recreation Ground has varied over the decades. Up until the 1980s it was considered the third largest rugby ground in England (behind Twickenham and Leicester Tigers home of Welford Road) with an official capacity of 21,172, which included a number of temporary stands.  This capacity was actually exceeded in 1969 when the ground hosted the final of the County Championship between Cornwall and Lancashire, when 25,000 are believed to have watched the game.     

The removal of the temporary stands, coupled with a more zealous approach to safety, saw the ground's capacity reduce to 12,000 in the 1990s to the current capacity (2018) of around 3,500.  This modern figure includes 580 seated in the grandstand, the rest standing with approximately 1,500 on the east bank, 800 on the north bank, 400 on the south bank and a further 200 or so in front of the grandstand / next to the clubhouse. In 2018 the local police gave an estimate of 3,000 but since Redruth were reported to have achieved an attendance of 4,000 for a National 2 promotion playoff game as recently as 2005, this is a little conservative.

Support
As one of the traditional rugby powerhouses in Cornwall, Redruth are also one of the best supported, second only to the Cornish Pirates, and, despite mixed fortunes over the past decade, they were the best supported club in National League 2 South, having topped the attendance charts every year since they arrived in the division during the 2011–12 season. Although the Recreation Ground no longer sees the huge crowds of yesteryear (even for Cornwall games), the 4,000 that attended Redruth's playoff victory against Macclesfield remains the club's best crowd for a competitive fixture over the past couple of decades. The club also still draws large crowds in excess of 1,000 for the traditional yearly fixture against neighbours Camborne.

Below is a summary of the club's league attendance since the 2000–01 season. The club enjoyed its best crowds during the 2008–09 season in the old National Division Two, thanks to derby games against fellow Cornish clubs, Launceston and Mounts Bay, both of which drew crowds in excess of 2,000. In recent years attendances at the Recreation Ground have fallen as the club has found itself without a Cornish league derby following the relegation of Launceston at the end of the 2015–16 season.

Season summary
Below is a summary of Redruth's performances in competitive rugby since the advent of the leagues in 1987–88.

Playing record
 First team

 Reserve team

Honours
 Cornwall Cup winners (10): 1979–80, 1983–84, 1987–88, 1988–89, 1990–91, 1992–93, 1994–95, 2002–03, 2003–04, 2006–07
 South West 1 champions: 1987–88
 National League Division 4 South champions: 1990–91
 National Division Three (north v south) promotion play-off winner: 2004–05
 Cornwall Super Cup winners (3): 2009–10, 2014–15, 2015–16
 Rodda's Cup winners (13): 2010 (1), 2011 (1), 2012 (2), 2013 (1), 2014 (2), 2015 (2), 2016 (2), 2017 (2)

Colts
The colts section is coached by David Wills and Jason Pengilly. The team has consistently finished highly in the national Colts competition, and won the U-17s cup and U-18s Cornwall Cup competitions in 2009.

Representative honours

Barbarians
 W. Abrahams – 2 appearances against Newport and Cardiff (1962)
 Andy Hawken – 2 appearances against the Combined Services (2002 and 2004)
 Darren Jacques – 1 appearance against Bedford (2009)
 C. "Bonzo" Johns – 2 appearances against Newport and Cardiff (1962)
 R. Keast – 1 appearance against Newport (1992)
 T. Pryor – 3 appearances against Newport, Penarth and East Midlands (1978)
 L. Semmens – 2 appearances against Newport and Cardiff (1948)
 H. Stevens – 1 appearance against East Midlands (1960)

England
 Richard Sharp – 14 caps
 John Charles "Barney" Solomon – 1 cap

England B
 Terry Pryor (Captain)

England Counties
 Darren Jacques
 Luke Collins
 Owen Hambly
 Peter Joyce
 Glenn Cooper
 Lewis Vinnicombe
 Sam Heard

Current standings

Notes

See also

 Rugby in Cornwall

References

External links
 Official website
 Former website

Cornish rugby union teams
Redruth
Rugby clubs established in 1875
Sports clubs in Cornwall